Project 57 was an open-air nuclear test conducted by the United States at the Nellis Air Force Range in 1957, following Operation Redwing, and preceding Operation Plumbbob.

Project 57 was a combination safety test. The high explosives of a nuclear weapon were detonated asymmetrically to simulate an accidental detonation. The purpose of the test was to verify that no yield would result as well as study the extent of plutonium contamination.

The contaminated area was initially fenced off and the contaminated equipment buried in place. In 1981, the U.S. Department of Energy decontaminated and decommissioned the site. Hundreds of thousands of cubic yards of soil and debris were removed from Area 13 and disposed of in a waste facility at the Nevada Test Site.

See also

 Project 56
 Operation Roller Coaster

References

Explosions in 1957
1957 in military history
Nevada Test Site nuclear explosive tests
1957 in Nevada
April 1957 events in the United States